Wang Yuanyuan may refer to:

Wang Yuanyuan (wrestler) (born 1977), male wrestler from China
Wang Yuanyuan (volleyball) (born 1997), female volleyball player from China